Wayne Thomas Proctor (12 June 1972) is a former Wales international rugby union footballer, who was a winger/full-back for Wales, Llanelli RFC and subsequently the Llanelli Scarlets.

A former Welsh schools international athlete, Proctor represented Wales at the 110m hurdles whilst a student at Cardigan Secondary School.

Proctor is still the current record holder for the most tries in the Welsh league and record try scorer for Llanelli RFC. He is the third highest points scorer for the Scarlets, with 872. Gareth Bowen is the second highest points scorer, with 1,055, and Stephen Jones is leading, with 2,716. He is also in fifth place on the appearances list for the Scarlets, with 273. He is only six appearances behind Chris Wyatt.

Having studied sports science at Pembrokeshire College, Proctor for many years held the position of Fitness Coach to the Llanelli Scarlets. Proctor was formerly Fitness coach for the Wales under 21s squad and is currently the fitness coach for the Wales Sevens Squad.

Notes

1972 births
Living people
Llanelli RFC players
Rugby union players from Cardigan
Sports scientists
Wales international rugby union players
Welsh rugby union players
Rugby union wings